It's Called the Easy Life is an EP by the English rock band Deaf Havana, released in 2008.

Track listing

Personnel
Ryan Mellor – lead vocals
James Veck-Gilodi – guitar, clean vocals
Chris Pennells – guitar
Lee Wilson – bass
Tom Ogden – drums, percussion

References

2008 EPs
Rock EPs
Deaf Havana albums